The following is a list of famous and notable former students of St. Mark's School of Southborough, Massachusetts.



A
Charles Francis Adams IV, businessman and philanthropist associated with Woods Hole Oceanographic Institute
Samuel A. Adams, '51, crusading CIA official who exposed bad Vietnam intelligence of Defense Department
Mark Albion, Harvard Business School Professor, 2010 National Entrepreneur of the Year (Social Entrepreneur)
Matthew Tobin Anderson '86, writer, winner of National Book Award
A. Watson Armour III, businessman and philanthropist

B

Charles L. Bartlett, 1956 winner of the Pulitzer Prize for National Reporting  
Melsahn Basabe, basketball player
Walter Van Rensselaer Berry, lawyer, friend and mentor of Edith Wharton  
Mike Birbiglia, comedian, class of 1996   
Ben Bradlee, former editor, The Washington Post  
Nicholas F. Brady, U.S. Treasury Secretary (1988–93); New Jersey Senator (1982)  
Nicholas Braun, actor  
John Leslie Breck, class of 1877, friend of Claude Monet who introduced Impressionism to the United States
Doug Brown, former National Hockey League player  
Greg Brown, former National Hockey League player  
Edward Burnett, U.S. representative from Massachusetts

C
Wayne Chatfield-Taylor, president of the Export-Import Bank, undersecretary of commerce
Gregory R. Ciottone, Harvard professor, White House consultant, pioneering physician in Counter-Terrorism Medicine
Blair Clark, journalist, former general manager of CBS News
Nick Clements, theoretical linguist specializing in phonology, notably with CNRS in Paris
Ernest Amory Codman, pioneering surgeon who made contributions to a variety of specialties and the study of medical outcomes
William G. Congdon, representationalist painter who used abstract expressionism techniques
Harry Crosby, poet and founder of the Black Sun Press

D
J. Richardson Dilworth, former Yale trustee and benefactor of Yale University
Peter Hoyt Dominick, U.S. congressman, then senator for Colorado; US Ambassador to Switzerland

E
Kenward Elmslie, lyricist, librettist, and playwright

F

Hamilton Fish III, U.S. congressman from New York, 1920–1945; elected to College Football Hall of Fame
Hamilton Fish V, publisher, politician and philanthropist
Christopher Forbes, publisher, vice-chairman of Forbes Inc.
Tim Forbes, publisher
Peter Hood Ballantine Frelinghuysen, Jr., U.S. representative from New Jersey from 1953 to 1975
Rodney P. Frelinghuysen, U.S. representative from New Jersey

G

Stephen Galatti, visionary director general of the American Field Service and educational pioneer
David Gardner, founder of the Motley Fool
C. Boyden Gray, White House counsel to President George H. W. Bush; U.S. envoy to the European Union

H
Michael N. Hall, molecular biologist
Mason Hammond, Harvard University classicist and Harvard historian
Truxtun Hare, Olympic athlete; elected to College Football Hall of Fame
Prince Hashim Al Hussein of Jordan
Harry G. Haskell, Jr., U.S. representative from Delaware and former president of Abercrombie and Fitch
Ingolv Helland, portrait artist

I
John Jay Iselin, former president, The Cooper Union in New York City

J
Brooks Jones, Theater Director, Musician, Founder of the Pepsico Festival

K
Robert Winthrop Kean, U.S. representative from New Jersey from 1938 to 1959
Thomas Kean, former New Jersey governor; former chairman of the 9/11 Commission; former president of Drew University
John Marshall Kernochan, IPR pioneer; founder of Columbia Law School's Kernochan Center for Law, Media, and the Arts
William A. Knowlton, four-star general, former superintendent of West Point

L

Storm Large, musician; her father Henry spent 45 years teaching history and coaching football and baseball at the school before his retirement in 2010
Frederick Lippitt, Rhode Island lawyer, politician, public servant and philanthropist
Robert Lowell, poet

M

Robert McC. Marsh (1878–1958), American lawyer, politician, and judge
Samuel Mather, Ohio industrialist, philanthropist, and benefactor of Kenyon College
Story Musgrave, astronaut

N
Dmitri Nabokov, son and translator of Valdimir Nabokov
Jordon Nardino, television writer
Eugene Nickerson, federal judge and Nassau County, New York politician
John H. Noseworthy, CEO and President of Mayo Clinic Health System

O

P
Robert William Packwood, Senator from Oregon 1969-1999
G. Willing "Wing" Pepper, Philadelphia businessman and philanthropist
Sheffield Phelps, Seattle philanthropist and arts patron
Joseph Pulitzer III, publisher
Ralph Pulitzer, publisher
George Putnam III '69, 1990 USA Todays investor of the year; trustee for The Putnam Companies

Q

R
Franklin Delano Roosevelt III, economist
George Emlen Roosevelt, financier and philanthropist
William Donner Roosevelt, investment banker and philanthropist
Emily Rutherfurd, television actress

S
Stephen "Laddie" Sanford, international polo player.
John Sargent, former president and CEO of publisher Doubleday and Company 
Eugene Lytton Scott, tennis player; member of International Tennis Hall of Fame, founder of the magazine Tennis Week
John Sculley, former president of PepsiCo and former CEO of Apple Computer
John W. Sears, Massachusetts Metropolitan District Commissioner 
Mason Sears, member of the Massachusetts General Court, Chairman of the Massachusetts Republican Party, and United States Representative to United Nations Trusteeship Council
John Simpkins, Representative from Massachusetts, 1895–1898
Nik Stauskas, professional basketball player (Sacramento Kings), 2013 Big Ten Conference Men's Basketball Player of the Year
Chris Shepley, Hockey Player at Colby College and notable Hockey Referee.

T
Kaleb Tarczewski, basketball player
Robert H. Thayer, New York lawyer, diplomat, and intelligence officer
Sigourney Thayer, theatrical producer, World War I aviator and poet
Herbert Sears Tuckerman, former Massachusetts state representative and senator 
Harrison Tweed, New York lawyer and bar association officer

U

V
Harold Stirling Vanderbilt, railroad executive, champion yachtsman and champion bridge player

William Kissam Vanderbilt II, railroad executive, industrialist, yachtsman, Fisher Island founder

W
James Wolcott Wadsworth Jr, New York senator from 1915 to 1927
T. Tileston Wells, Consul General for Romania in America
O.Z. Whitehead, well-known character actor
Karl Wiedergott, actor, best known for doing voices for The Simpsons; his father Fritz was the longtime athletic director at the school
Sean Wilsey (did not graduate), memoirist

X

Y
Scott Young, National Hockey League player, St. Louis Blues

Z

St. Mark's